The 1977 IIHF European U18 Championship was the tenth playing of the IIHF European Junior Championships.  With the creation of the World Junior Hockey Championships, which used players under the age of 20, the European championships adjusted the age limitation to being under 18.

Group A 
Played in Bremerhaven, West Germany from April 1–10, 1977.  Romania was to participate but withdrew (and forfeited) in the aftermath of the earthquake that hit the area in March of that year.

Romania, after withdrawing, was relegated to Group B for 1978.

Tournament Awards
Top Scorer: Conny Silfverberg  (17 Points)
Top Goalie: Pelle Lindbergh
Top Defenceman:Peter Slanina
Top Forward: Conny Silfverberg

Group B 
Played in Bilbao and San Sebastián, Spain from March 30 to April 4, 1977.

First round 
Group 1

Group 2

Placing round 

Norway was promoted to group A, and Spain was relegated to the new Group C, for 1978.

References

Complete results

Junior
IIHF European Junior Championship tournament
International ice hockey competitions hosted by Spain
International ice hockey competitions hosted by West Germany
Euro
IHF European U18 Championship
Bremerhaven
Sport in Bilbao
Sport in San Sebastián
IHF European U18 Championship
Jun